The discography of American rapper, singer and songwriter Vic Mensa consists of one studio album, one collaboration album, one mixtape, five extended plays and 38 singles (including 18 singles as a featured artist).

In July 2010, Vic Mensa released his debut extended play, Straight Up. His debut mixtape, Innanetape, was released on September 30, 2013, to positive reviews from music critics. His debut single, "Down on My Luck" was released in June 2014 by Virgin EMI and later went on to chart at number 37 on the UK Singles Chart. His second single, "U Mad" featuring Kanye West was released in April 2015. Mensa's mixtape and singles was later followed up by his second extended play, There's Alot Going On, which was released in June 2016. Mensa would eventually release his debut studio album, The Autobiography, on July 28, 2017. The album debuted at number 27 on the US Billboard 200 chart.

In December 2018, Mensa released his fourth extended play titled, Hooligans. Mensa would later release a self-titled collaborative album with his band, 93Punx, on August 23, 2019. His fifth extended play, V Tape, was released on August 21, 2020.

Albums

Studio albums

Collaborative albums

Mixtapes

Extended plays

Singles

As lead artist

As featured artist

Other charted and certified songs

Guest appearances

References

Discographies of American artists
Hip hop discographies